Joseph Henry (1797–1878) was an American scientist.

Joseph Henry may also refer to:

Joseph Henry (politician) (1853–1894), New Zealand Member of Parliament
Joseph Henry (bow maker) (1823–1870), French bow maker 
Joe Henry (born 1960), Grammy-award-winning American musician
Joe Henry (baseball) (1930–2009), American baseball player
The Joseph Henry, a  mine-planting ship of the U.S. Army
Joseph Henry Press, an American publisher named after the scientist